Penicillium tardum is an anamorph species of fungus in the genus Penicillium which produces rugulosin.

References

Further reading 
 
 
 
 
 
 
 

tardum
Fungi described in 1930
Taxa named by Charles Thom